Unto the Locust is the seventh studio album by American heavy metal band Machine Head, released in Australia on September 23, in the UK on September 26 and worldwide on September 27, 2011. The album was produced and mixed by Robb Flynn, and it was the band's highest charting album ever, charting at 22 on the Billboard 200, until their following release Bloodstone & Diamonds charted at 21. Unto the Locust was recorded in Green Day's Jingletown Studios. On June 14, 2011, Machine Head released the advance mix of their album track Locust, which was included on the 2011 Mayhem Festival iTunes sampler. This would be Machine Head's last studio album with co-founder and bassist Adam Duce before he was fired due to "ongoing differences" with the band on February 11, 2013. It has sold over 100,000 copies in the United States. At just under 49 minutes long it is the band's shortest album released.

Release
The first single from Unto the Locust, simply titled "Locust", was released on June 10, 2011. Side A begins with the song "Locust" and Side B contains the two live tracks "Beautiful Mourning" from The Blackening and "Bite the Bullet" from Through the Ashes of Empires.

Sloat stated about the "Locust" clip:

Special edition
The UK version of Metal Hammer magazine have announced that a special edition fan-pack would be released by the magazine with a 132-page
special issue with exclusive behind-the-scenes access to the making of the album, extensive interviews with every member, historic shots from the band's personal collections, a guide to their custom rigs, and a diary of their massive Rockstar Energy Drink Mayhem Festival tour.
Metal Hammer also gave away a special edition vinyl with their November 2011 issue containing the song Locust with alternate lyrics on the A-Side and Beautiful Mourning and Bite the Bullet (both live) on the B-Side.

Reception

Unto the Locust received critical acclaim from music critics. At Metacritic, which assigns an aggregate rating out of 100 to reviews from mainstream critics, the album received an average score of 91, based on 6 reviews, which indicates "Universal acclaim".

The songs "I Am Hell" and "This Is The End" received heavy rotation on college radio stations, most notably on WVYC's After-Hour Abomination. Unto The Locust sold over 17,000 copies in the United States in its first week of release to land at position No. 22 on the Billboard 200 chart — putting Machine Head in the Top 25 for the first time in the band's 19-year history. This is also their third consecutive album to show at least a 20 percent increase in sales over its predecessor. This was accomplished in spite of the music market dropping by more than 45 percent in the four and a half years since the release of the band's previous album, The Blackening.

In 2011, the album won a Metal Storm Award for Best Thrash Metal Album.

Accolades
Year-end rankings

Decade-end rankings

Tour
The band toured the album under the name of The Eighth Plague beginning November 1, 2011. Support came from the bands Bring Me the Horizon, DevilDriver and Darkest Hour. Robb Flynn made a statement saying that "This will no doubt be the heaviest show you're going to see this year. A lot of the greatest shows of our last touring cycle were in Europe and the U.K., so the prospect of this lineup combined with these crowds has us extremely stoked to get out there and tear it up! New material, great venues, killer fans... we absolutely cannot wait!"

The band also played two warm up shows, at Club Vegas in Salt Lake City, Utah and The Knitting Factory, Reno on July 5 and 7 respectively. These dates were first time the band had taken the stage since March 2010 after the touring cycle for their last album The Blackening ended. The band performed on the 2011 edition of Rockstar Mayhem Festival, marking their 2nd time on the tour, as they were on the inaugural tour in 2008. They spent the first 9 dates on the tour from July 9–20 playing the Main Stage, after which they headlined on the Revolver Stage spanning July 22 – August 14.

Track listing

Personnel

Machine Head
Robb Flynn – lead vocals,  rhythm guitar
Adam Duce – bass, backing vocals
Phil Demmel – lead guitar, backing vocals
Dave McClain – drums

Additional musicians
Rachel, Kathy, Genie, and Michi of Quartet Rouge – Strings on "I Am Hell", "Darkness Within", and "Who We Are"

Production
Robb Flynn – production, mixing
Juan Urteaga – mixing, engineering
Brad Kobylczak – assistant engineering
Lee Bothwick – assistant engineering
Ted Jensen – mastering
Paul Gerrard – artwork
Myriam Santos – photography
Strephon Taylor – logo design

Chart positions

References

2011 albums
Machine Head (band) albums
Roadrunner Records albums